U.Kothapalli is a village and a Mandal in Kakinada district in the state of Andhra Pradesh in India.

References 

Villages in Kakinada district
Mandals in Kakinada district